Francesca Vanthielen (born 24 December 1972 in Eeklo) is a Belgian television actress and host, radio presenter, and economist. She is probably best known internationally for playing the lead role in the Svalbard-set adventure film When the Light Comes (1998) and for hosting Sterren op de dansvloer (Dancing with the Stars) between 2005 and 2008. She has worked as a host on Radio TAM TAM (BRT), Q-music and Studio Brussel.

Her childhood and adolescent years were spent in Zonhoven and she currently resides in Antwerp. Her father is an economist in Diepenbeek and her mother is a social worker in Geel. Vanthielen holds a degree in Applied Economics from the Katholieke Universiteit Leuven and has a Post Graduate in Acting from the Mountview Theatre School in London. In 2009 she obtained a master's degree in comparative and international politics at the Katholieke Universiteit Leuven.

Filmography
Bingo (TV series) (1987)
Boys as Dana (1992)
When the Light Comes as Ellen (1998)
Spoed (TV series) (2002)
Wittekerke (TV series) as Phaedra Govaerts (2003-2004)
Aspe (TV series) as Hannelore Martens (2004—)
Baantjer (TV series) as Eva de Long (2006)
Skating with Celebrities (TV series) as host (2006)
Dancing with the Stars (TV series) as host (2005-2008)
Sterren op het IJs (TV series) as host (2007)
De Italiaanse Droom (TV series) (2008-2009)
LouisLouise (TV series) (2009)
De Andalusische droom (TV series) as host (2009-2010)
Gelukkig getrouwd? (TV series) as host (2010)
My Name Is (TV series) as host (2010)
Domino, de zoektocht (TV series) as host (2011)
Cijfers Liegen Niet (TV series) as host (2012)

References

External links

1972 births
Living people
Belgian television actresses
Belgian television presenters
Belgian radio presenters
Belgian economists
Belgian women economists
People from Eeklo
KU Leuven alumni
20th-century Belgian actresses
21st-century Belgian actresses
Belgian soap opera actresses
Belgian women radio presenters
Belgian women television presenters